"This Is the Way We Roll" is a single released by Hammer from the album Too Legit to Quit.

The song was featured in the film, The Addams Family, and was performed by Hammer on Saturday Night Live. A music video was produced for the track as well.

Track listing
 "This Is the Way We Roll" (High Street Mix)
 "Rollin' on Oaktown Style"
 "Instrumental Oaktown Style"
 "Addams Groove" (LP version)
 "Addams Groove" (TRUE instrumental)

Chart position
The song peaked at No. 86 on the US chart and No. 20 on the US R&B charts.

References

1992 singles
MC Hammer songs
Songs written by MC Hammer
1991 songs
Capitol Records singles